The Center for the Arts at the University at Buffalo is a cultural institution established in 1994 on the University at Buffalo North Campus in Amherst. This multidisciplinary arts center is a public venue for theatrical and artistic performances, exhibitions and events, and also is a teaching facility for students in arts disciplines such as media studies, art, theatre, and dance.

The Center for the Arts presents a wide range of high quality performing arts and visual arts for the University, the State and the region, and enhances and augment the academic activities of the fine and performing arts departments at the University at Buffalo.

Through its facilities and programs, the Center for the Arts plays a significant role in accomplishing the mission of the University, presenting enriched educational and cultural opportunities through University performances, state and regional events, and national and international touring productions and exhibits.

History
Designed by Gwathmey Siegel & Architects Associates LLC, the building was erected for $50 million.  The  facility was opened by the fall semester of 1994 as the Fine Arts Center, and was renamed the Center for the Arts, its current name, later that year.

Theatres

Mainstage Theatre 

Seating 1750, the Mainstage is the largest theatre in the Center.

Drama Theatre
The Center's other proscenium theatre, the Drama Theatre is a smaller theatre (seating 400). Like its larger companion, it too features a movable proscenium. It is fully trapped.

Black Box Theatre
The smallest of the theatres in the facility, the Black Box Theatre, is designed with the standard flexibility of a Black box theater, supporting 175 seats in various configurations.

References

External links
 Official website

University at Buffalo
Culture of Buffalo, New York
University and college arts centers in the United States
Tourist attractions in Buffalo, New York
Performing arts centers in New York (state)
1994 establishments in New York (state)